Senne Leysen (born 18 March 1996 in Tielen) is a Belgian cyclist, who currently rides for UCI ProTeam . He is the son of retired cyclist Bart Leysen.

Major results

2014
 National Junior Road Championships
2nd Road race
3rd Time trial
2015
 5th Overall Tour de Berlin
1st  Young rider classification
2016
 3rd Time trial, National Under-23 Road Championships
 10th Time trial, UEC European Under-23 Road Championships
 10th Chrono Champenois
2017
 1st  Time trial, National Under-23 Road Championships
 6th Time trial, UCI Under-23 Road World Championships
 9th Paris–Roubaix Espoirs
 10th Time trial, UEC European Under-23 Road Championships
2020
 2nd Overall Tour Bitwa Warszawska 1920
1st  Young rider classification
1st Stage 3

Grand Tour general classification results timeline

References

External links

1996 births
Living people
Belgian male cyclists
People from Kasterlee
Cyclists from Antwerp Province
21st-century Belgian people